Shongelo Creek is a stream in the U.S. state of Mississippi.

Shongelo is a name derived from the Choctaw language meaning "cypress tree". A variant name is "Shongola Creek".

References

Rivers of Mississippi
Rivers of Smith County, Mississippi
Mississippi placenames of Native American origin